FSR may refer to:

Broadcasting 
 Fox Sports Radio, an American radio network
Fox Sports Racing, a U.S. motorsports TV channel
 Yle FSR, a Finnish radio network

Entertainment 
 Flower, Sun, and Rain, a video game from Grasshopper Manufacture
 Folk Soul Revival, an American country music band
 Forces of Satan Records, a defunct Norwegian record label
 Fresh Sound, a Spanish record label
 Fresh Sounds Records, an defunct American record label
 Full Surface Records, an American record label

Politics 
 Financial Services Roundtable, an American lobby group
 Former Soviet republics
 Friends of Soviet Russia, an American friendship organization

Science and technology 
 Fractional synthetic rate
 Finite-state recognizer
 Fisheye State Routing
 Flood Studies Report, a hydrological text
 Force-sensing resistor
 Free spectral range
 FidelityFX Super Resolution, part of AMD's FidelityFX toolset

Scouting 
 Federation of Scouts of Russia
 Forestburg Scout Reservation, a Boy Scout Camp in New York, United States

Other uses 
 First ScotRail, a defunct Scottish rail company
 First Strike Ration of the United States Army
 Five-second rule (basketball)
 Fleet Street Reports: Cases on Intellectual Property Law
 Floor space ratio
 Forest Service Road
 Fort Smith Railroad, an American rail company
 Full-service restaurant

See also